Mohammad Saif (born 21 July 1976) is an Indian cricketer who played for Uttar Pradesh in domestic cricket. He is a Right-hand bat batsman who played Youth cricket for India Under-19 cricket team. He scored 4 runs on his Twenty20 debut against Railways cricket team in March 2015 when he returned to competitive cricket after 6 long year. He scored  56 from just 19 balls in Ranji Trophy quarter final.

His father is Mohammad Tarif and his younger brother is Mohammad Kaif.

References

External links
 

1976 births
Living people
Indian cricketers
Uttar Pradesh cricketers
Cricketers from Allahabad